The Kuznetsky Alatau mine is a large iron mine located in central-southern Russia in the Kemerovo Oblast. Kuznetsky Alatau represents one of the largest iron ore reserves in Russia and in the world having estimated reserves of 3 billion tonnes of ore grading 48% iron metal.

See also 
 List of mines in Russia

References 

Iron mines in Russia